Qaleh Now-e Hashivar (also Romanized as Qal‘eh Now-e Hashīvār; also known as Qal‘eh-i-Nau, Qal‘eh Now, and Qal‘eh-ye Now) is a village in Hashivar Rural District, in the Central District of Darab County, Fars Province, Iran. At the 2006 census, its population was 172, in 32 families.

References 

Populated places in Darab County